Start is an unincorporated community and census-designated place in Richland Parish, Louisiana, United States. In 2010, it was named as a census-designated place with a population of 905. On September 8, 2018, Start held a community wide celebration in recognition of its centennial year as the named place of Start.

Geography
Start is located at  (32.48639, -91.85917). Start is located near the Boeuf River to the east and Lafourche Diversion Canal to its west. A small tributary called Crew Lake flows through the community.

Demographics

Major highways
 I-20, Exit 132
 US 80
 Louisiana Highway 133

The Kansas City Southern Railway also passes through the community, running east and west.

Community
Start is a small, rural, farming community. There are four churches, including Start Baptist Church, Crew Lake Methodist Church, Faith Baptist Church, and Start Assembly of God. The Start Post Office, Start Fire Department, and Start Water System each serve the residents in this community. The Start Fire Department has two stations, located on the north and south side of the railroad.

Start Elementary School, which is operated by the Richland Parish School Board, is a public school for Pre Kindergarten through the eight grade.

History

Prior to the creation of Richland Parish in 1868, The area now recognized as Start was situated in Morehouse Parish. After the new parish of Richland was formed, this area was  often referred to as Ward 3, Crew Lake, Charleston, or Wynn Island. Start officially derived its name in 1918 when the United States Postal Service officially accepted it as new name of the community. Charleston was originally submitted, but this name was rejected. The owner of a small mercantile store in Start named James M. Morgan was granted permission to receive mail at his store, but the area would need a permanent name. James Morgan's daughter, Rachel, suggested that they name the community Start, because they were making a new Start. This name was officially approved by the USPS on September 7, 1918. Louisiana Public Broadcasting aired a segment in 2006 on Louisiana: The State We're In, detailing how the community came up with the name of Start. In the summer on 1923, the Richland Parish School Board passed a motion to advertise for bids on a new high school building, to be known once constructed as Start High School. Marie Robinson was the sole graduate of Start's first graduating class, held in the spring of 1925.

Up until November 29, 1930 mail was continually delivered to both Start and Crew Lake, (located directly west of Start.) After this date, Crew Lake ceased to also serve as a post office location, and the primary hub for mail became Start.

In 1937, Congressman Newt V. Mills announced that the Resettlement Administration, (a New Deal program initiated under President Franklin D. Roosevelt), had purchased the 3,000 acre Millsaps Plantation. This program provided for approximately 40 new families to move in to the Start community.

Notable people
Julia Letlow, member of the United States House of Representatives, elected in a special election to fill her husband's term 
Luke Letlow, former member-elect to the United States House of Representatives who died of COVID-19 in December 2020.
Tim McGraw, country singer

Community gallery

References

Census-designated places in Louisiana
Unincorporated communities in Richland Parish, Louisiana
Unincorporated communities in Louisiana